Robert Oscar Crockett (March 11, 1881 – October 29, 1955) was an American lawyer and Republican politician who served as a member of the Virginia Senate, representing the state's 3rd district from 1920 to 1922.

References

External links
 
 

1881 births
1955 deaths
Republican Party Virginia state senators
People from Tazewell, Virginia
Washington and Lee University alumni
20th-century American politicians